"Yumekui" is Ai Otsuka's 12th single under the avex trax label.

"Yumekui" was used as the theme song to the movie "Tokyo Friends the Movie", which Otsuka starred in. The b-side, which is a ballad named "tears", was also used in the movie.

During the first week, the single debuted at #5 with 63,428 copies sold, making it Otsuka's lowest debut sales of the year. Although the single debuted with relatively low sales, it sold a total of 145,281 copies in 2006, making it the 66th best-selling single of the year.

Unlike most of Otsuka's previous singles, "Yumekui" only had one cover whereas usually there are two different ones; one for the CD-only version and one for the CD+DVD version.

Track listing

Live performances
31 July 2006 – Hey! Hey! Hey!
4 August 2006 – Music Station
4 August 2006 – Music Fighter
5 August 2006 – PopJam DX 
13 August 2006 – CDTV

Charts
Oricon Sales Chart (Japan)

References

2006 singles
Ai Otsuka songs
Avex Trax singles
2006 songs
Japanese film songs
Songs written by Ai Otsuka